The Banks House is a historic house on Arkansas Highway 72 west of Hiwasse, Arkansas.  Built in 1900, it is a -story wood frame rendition of a double pen form more often found in log construction.  It has weatherboard siding, a side gable main roof, and a wide single story front porch with round columns and a hip roof.  A chimney rises at the eastern end, and an ell extends the house to the rear.  It is a well-preserved local example of vernacular frontier architecture.

The house was listed on the National Register of Historic Places in 1988.

See also
National Register of Historic Places listings in Benton County, Arkansas

References

Houses on the National Register of Historic Places in Arkansas
Houses completed in 1900
Houses in Benton County, Arkansas
National Register of Historic Places in Benton County, Arkansas
1900 establishments in Arkansas
Double pen architecture in the United States